Li Fengying (also written as Li Feng-ying) (born January 23, 1975) is a female weightlifter who competed for Chinese Taipei in the 2000 Summer Olympics and won a silver medal in featherweight category. She lifted a total of 212.5 kg (snatch – 98 kg, clean & jerk – 115 kg) at bodyweight  of 53 kg.

External links
Li Fengying's profile at Sports Reference.com

1975 births
Living people
Weightlifters at the 2000 Summer Olympics
Olympic medalists in weightlifting
Olympic weightlifters of Taiwan
Olympic silver medalists for Taiwan
Taiwanese female weightlifters
Asian Games medalists in weightlifting
Weightlifters at the 1998 Asian Games
Weightlifters at the 2002 Asian Games
Medalists at the 2000 Summer Olympics
Taiwanese people from Hunan
Asian Games silver medalists for Chinese Taipei
Medalists at the 1998 Asian Games
20th-century Taiwanese women
21st-century Taiwanese women